II Indian Brigade, Royal Horse Artillery was a brigade of the Royal Horse Artillery formed at the outbreak of World War I.  It served with 2nd Indian Cavalry Division on the Western Front.  It was redesignated XVII Brigade, RHA in February 1917 and XVII Army Brigade, RHA just before being disbanded in April 1918.

History

II Indian Brigade, RHA
II Indian Brigade, RHA was formed in December 1914 for the 2nd Indian Cavalry Division in France.  It commanded
N Battery, RHA from IX Brigade, RHA at Secunderabad, India
V Battery, RHA from XII Brigade, RHA at Meerut, India
X Battery, RHA from XIII Brigade, RHA at Mhow, India
 II Indian RHA Brigade Ammunition Column
Each battery was armed with six 13 pounder guns.

The brigade served with the 2nd Indian Cavalry Division on the Western Front and the brigade commander acted as Commander Royal Horse Artillery (CRHA).  In practice, the batteries were permanently assigned to the cavalry brigades, viz:
 N Battery with 9th (Secunderabad) Cavalry Brigade
 V Battery with 7th (Meerut) Cavalry Brigade
 X Battery with 5th (Mhow) Cavalry Brigade then 3rd (Ambala) Cavalry Brigade from 15 September 1915 when it arrived from 1st Indian Cavalry Division

In June 1916, 7th (Meerut) Cavalry Brigade (complete with V Battery, RHA) left the division and was reformed for service in Mesopotamia.  Its place was taken by the Canadian Cavalry Brigade with its attached Royal Canadian Horse Artillery Brigade (A and B Batteries, RCHA each with four 13 pounders).

Other than the Battle of the Somme in 1916 (Battle of Bazentin Ridge, 14–17 July and Battle of Flers-Courcelette, 15–22 September) and the Battle of Cambrai in 1917, the division was not involved in battle. Instead, it was held in reserve in case of a breakthrough, although it did send parties to the trenches on a number of occasions. They would hold the line, or act as Pioneers; such parties were designated as, for example, the Mhow Battalion.

XVII Brigade, RHA
On 26 November 1916, 2nd Indian Cavalry Division was renamed 5th Cavalry Division.  Consequently, on 24 February 1917, the brigade was redesignated as XVII Brigade, RHA.

In March 1918, the 5th Cavalry Division was broken up in France. The British and Canadian units remained in France and the Indian elements were sent to Egypt to help constitute 2nd Mounted Division.  The brigade became XVII Army Brigade, RHA at this time, though this new identity was short lived.

On 13 March, G Battery, RHA joined from IV Brigade, RHA (3rd Cavalry Division) to bring the brigade back up to three batteries.  On 9 April, G and N Batteries, RHA left for V Army Brigade, RHA.  On 17 April 1918, the brigade HQ was dissolved.

See also

Notes

References

Bibliography

External links
2nd Indian Cavalry Division on the Regimental Warpath

Royal Horse Artillery brigades
Artillery units and formations of World War I
Military units and formations established in 1914
Military units and formations disestablished in 1918